Christian Saba (born 29 December 1978) is a Ghanaian former footballer who played as a central defender. He is currently the team official of Bayern Munich U19.

One of the most lengthy tenures of any foreign player with a sole team, he was never able however to make it past the reserves of Bayern Munich.

Club career
Saba was born in Accra. After appearing in his country for local King Harrison Accra and Accra Hearts of Oak.

Saba joined FC Bayern Munich's youth system in 1995 at the age of 16, alongside compatriot Emanuel Bentil. Neither was able to break into the first team, but the former did manage to stay with the club, playing for the reserves and being an occasional standby player for the main squad.

Saba's debut in the Bundesliga occurred not with Bayern, but with Hertha BSC, where he was on loan for 1998–99: on 29 May 1999, in the season's closer, he played ten minutes in a 6–1 home routing of Hamburger SV in what would be his only top flight appearance. The following campaign he was loaned to Arminia Bielefeld, but he did not collect one single minute of action and the team was also relegated from the top level.

From 2000 onwards Saba remained a defensive stalwart for Bayern's second team, which competed in Regionalliga Süd. He was released in June 2011 at nearly 33, after 16 years with the club.

International career
Saba was selected for Ghana's under-23 team for the 1996 Summer Olympics, alongside Bayern teammate Samuel Kuffour, and scored twice against Italy in the group stages, helping qualify the African precisely at the expense of the Europeans.

Personal life 
His brother Robert Saba was also a footballer who played for Accra Hearts of Oak.  The duo lost their father Daniel Saba in 2017.

Honours

Club 
FC Bayern Munich II
IFA Shield: 2005
Maccabi Netanya

 Liga Leumit: 2013–14

International 
Ghana U-17

 FIFA U-17 World Championship: 1995

References

External links
Bayern Munich official profile 

1978 births
Living people
Footballers from Accra
Ghanaian footballers
Association football defenders
Accra Hearts of Oak S.C. players
Bundesliga players
3. Liga players
FC Bayern Munich footballers
FC Bayern Munich II players
Hertha BSC players
Arminia Bielefeld players
Ghana international footballers
Footballers at the 1996 Summer Olympics
Olympic footballers of Ghana
Ghanaian expatriate footballers
Expatriate footballers in Germany
Ghanaian expatriate sportspeople in Germany